Nura, Kazakhstan may refer to:

 Nura, Nura District, a district capital in Karaganda Region
 Nura, Shet District, a village in Karaganda Region  
 Nura, Yrgyz District, a village in Aktobe Region
 Nura, Enbekshikazakh District, a village in Almaty Region
 Nura, Talgar District, a village in Almaty Region
 Nura, Ordabasy District, a village in Turkistan Region